Sebastian Kerk (born 17 April 1994) is a German professional footballer who plays as an attacking midfielder for Hannover 96.

Career
Kerk began his football career in his hometown club, TSG Bad Wurzach, where he played until 2005. He moved to FV Ravensburg, where he spent three years. In 2008, he joined youth setup of SC Freiburg.

He made his first team debut for SC Freiburg on 18 May 2013 against Schalke 04.

On 31 August 2016, Kerk joined 1. FC Kaiserslautern on a season-long loan.

Kerk joined 1. FC Nürnberg in June 2017, reportedly signing a three-year contract.

References

External links 
 

Living people
1994 births
German footballers
Association football midfielders
Germany youth international footballers
Bundesliga players
2. Bundesliga players
FV Ravensburg players
SC Freiburg players
1. FC Nürnberg players
1. FC Kaiserslautern players
VfL Osnabrück players
Hannover 96 players